The West Somerset ALTS Tournament was a late Victorian period combined men's and women's grass court tennis tournament founded in 1879, and held for five editions only until 1883. The event was organised by the West Somerset Archery and Lawn Tennis Society, and was held at Batts Park, Taunton, Somerset, England.

History
he West Somerset ALTS Tournament was an late 19th century grass court tennis tournament founded in 1879, and organised by the West Somerset Archery and Lawn Tennis Society. The society usually the event held at Batts Park, Taunton, Somerset, England. The first winner of the mens singles was England's Francis Escott Hancock.

Results

Mens Singles
 Incomplete Roll

Men's Doubles

Mixed Doubles

References

Grass court tennis tournaments
Defunct tennis tournaments in the United Kingdom